Mountain View High School (MVHS) is located in Orem, Utah, United States. It is part of Utah County's Alpine School District. The school first opened its doors to the graduating class of 1980–81. Every year students from Orem Junior High and Lakeridge Junior High enter MVHS.

Like other schools in Utah, it has been accredited by the Utah State Office of Education.

History

2016 Stabbing incident 
On November 15, 2016, five students were stabbed in the boys locker room by a 16-year old student, who also turned the knife on themself. Each of the students received at least one stab wound, but none were considered life-threatening by the Orem Police Department. The student was arrested and booked into a juvenile correctional facility.

Athletics 
The school sponsors fourteen sports and 23 varsity teams, including baseball, basketball, cheer, cross-country, football, golf, lacrosse, soccer, softball, swimming, tennis, track and field, volleyball, and wrestling. MVHS has won 90 UHSAA state athletic championships and seven national championships. As of November 2021, MVHS has more state championships than any other Utah high school in the sports of girls basketball, boys cross country, and girls cross country. 

The Utah Interscholastic Athletic Administrators Association (UIAAA) awarded MVHS the 5A classification Director's Cup for the 2020-21 and 2021-22 school years. The Director's Cup is awarded for athletic success (40%), academic achievement (40%), and student, school, and community sportsmanship (20%). 

In 2021, there was an allegation by a volleyball player from another Utah high school about intimidation and harassment by a Mountain View High School coach. Also in 2021, a football game spurred an investigation from the United States Department of Education Office for Civil Rights when fans allegedly used racial slurs and threw drinks at opposing players.

Notable faculty
 Eli Herring

Notable alumni
 Leif Arrhenius, NCAA Shot Put champion; professional track athlete
 Niklas Arrhenius, world high school record holder for discus; Olympic athlete; attended  Brigham Young University
 Ben Cahoon, Canadian Football League MVP and Hall of Famer
 Setema Gali, former NFL player
 Travis Hansen, former NBA player
 Mitch Jones, former MLB player
 Kevin McGiven, NCAA Football coach - currently the Offensive coordinator for San Jose State
 Brendan Newby, Olympic Freestyle Skier
 Noelle Pikus-Pace, 2014 Olympic silver medalist in skeleton; Skeleton World Cup Champion
 Shauna Rohbock, 2006 Olympic silver medalist in bobsled; professional soccer player
 Seth Scott, basketball player
 Erin Thorn, WNBA basketball player

See also

 List of high schools in Utah

References

External links

 
 Alpine School District

1980 establishments in Utah
Public high schools in Utah
Educational institutions established in 1980
Schools in Utah County, Utah
Buildings and structures in Orem, Utah